Local elections were held in Marilao, Bulacan, on May 9, 2016, within the Philippine general election. The voters (Marileños) will elect for the elective local posts in the municipality: the mayor, vice mayor, and eight councilors.

Mayoral and vice mayoral election
Incumbent mayor Juanito Santiago will run independently with lost mayoral candidate Henry Lutao as his running mate.

Gerry Atienza Sr, the father of Gerry Atienza Jr, will run independently while supporting Andre Santos' running for re-election.

Lost mayoral candidate JM-Jun Montaos will run independently

Results
The candidates for mayor and vice mayor with the highest number of votes wins the seat; they are voted separately, therefore, they may be of different parties when elected.

Mayoral and vice mayoral elections

Municipal Council election
Voting is via plurality-at-large voting: Voters vote for eight candidates and the eight candidates with the highest number of votes are elected.

References

2016 Philippine local elections
Elections in Marilao